Ariarathes II (Ariaráthēs; ruled 301–280 BC), satrap and king of Cappadocia, son of Holophernes, fled into Armenia after the death of his uncle and adopted father Ariarathes I, ruler of Cappadocia. After the death of Eumenes he recovered Cappadocia with the assistance of Ardoates, the Armenian king, and killed Amyntas, the Macedonian satrap, in 301 BC, but was forced to accept Seleucid suzerainty. He was succeeded by Ariaramnes, the eldest of his three sons.

References

Sources 
 
 
 
 

Kings of Cappadocia
3rd-century BC rulers
4th-century BC rulers
4th-century BC Iranian people
3rd-century BC Iranian people
Ariarathid dynasty
Adoptees